The 2009–10 Malian Première Division is the 45th season and current championship of the Highest-Level of Professional Soccer in Mali.

Overview
Though the competition's structure has varied over time, the size of the league remained the same from the previous season. The championship is once again contested by 14 teams between December 2009 and September 2010. The league will be conducted over 26 rounds as well with all teams playing against each other twice on a home and away basis. The defending champions are Djoliba AC who won their second consecutive and 21st overall league championship.

The structure by which promoted clubs are chosen has changed over time, but as of 2008, the two promoted teams are chosen from regional league tournaments. One club comes from Malian Groupe B league soccer tournament (for teams near Bamako and the west) and the other is the Malian Groupe A league which is a tournament for clubs outside Bamako. AS Sigui were promoted from Group A and AS Police were promoted from Group B.

Malian Premiere Division Club Information
Source:

Table

References

Mali
Malian Première Division seasons
football
football